Toirdelbach mac Murchada meic Briain (c. 999 – 23 April 1014) was the grandson of Brian Boru and one of the leaders of the Dál gCais-led Irish army at the Battle of Clontarf, where he was killed (likely by drowning) while leading Irish forces pursuing the fleeing Vikings.

Toirdelbach was the son of Murchad mac Briain, the putative heir of Brian, who was also killed at Clontarf.

1014 deaths
Year of birth uncertain